In mathematics, a sparse polynomial (also lacunary polynomial or fewnomial) is a polynomial that has far fewer terms than its degree and number of variables would suggest. Examples include
monomials, polynomials with only one term,
binomials, polynomials with only two terms, and
trinomials, polynomials with only three terms.

Research on sparse polynomials has included work on algorithms whose running time grows as a function of the number of terms rather than on the degree, for problems including polynomial multiplication and division, root-finding algorithms, and polynomial greatest common divisors. Sparse polynomials have also been used in pure mathematics, especially in the study of Galois groups, because it has been easier to determine the Galois groups of certain families of sparse polynomials than it is for other polynomials. 

The algebraic varieties determined by sparse polynomials have a simple structure, which is also reflected in the structure of the solutions of certain related differential equations. Additionally, a sparse positivstellensatz exists for univariate sparse polynomials. It states that the non-negativity of a polynomial can be certified by sos polynomials whose degree only depends on the number of monomials of the polynomial.

References

Polynomials